Banner Township may refer to:

Arkansas
 Banner Township, Ashley County, Arkansas
 Banner Township, Saline County, Arkansas

Illinois
 Banner Township, Effingham County, Illinois
 Banner Township, Fulton County, Illinois

Iowa
 Banner Township, Woodbury County, Iowa

Kansas
 Banner Township, Dickinson County, Kansas
 Banner Township, Jackson County, Kansas

Township name disambiguation pages